The following highways are numbered 82A:

United States
 Nebraska Link 82A
 New York State Route 82A (former)
 Oklahoma State Highway 82A (former)

See also
 List of highways numbered 82